The 2017 Canadian Soccer League season (known as the Givova Canadian Soccer League for sponsorship reasons) was the 20th season under the Canadian Soccer League name. The season began on May 26, 2017, and concluded on September 30, 2017, with the CSL Championship final. The season saw the York Region Shooters claim their third CSL Championship by defeating Scarborough SC in a penalty shootout. In the Second Division, FC Ukraine United went home with their first CSL double after defeating Burlington SC in the finals. FC Ukraine became the second club in the Second Division after TFC Academy II in 2012 to go undefeated the entire regular season. While FC Vorkuta became the second expansion franchise in CSL history since the Ottawa Wizards in the 2001 season to claim the r title in their debut season.

Summary

First Division title race 
The 2017 season was a highly competitive campaign, particularly in the First Division. The title was heavily contested between FC Vorkuta, Serbian White Eagles, and York Region Shooters. The outcome was determined on the final week of the regular season with Vorkuta claiming their first division title. The divisional champions were an expansion franchise with a noted history at the amateur level around the York Region. 

Vorkuta relied on the Ukrainian soccer market for player recruitment and hired the services of Serhiy Zayets as head coach. Another source of talent acquisition came from FC Ukraine United's decision to relegate to the Second Division which allowed Vorkuta to acquire Ukraine United's key players. The club's foray into the professional scene was instantly felt as they managed to obtain the first position in the first two weeks. The majority of the season they were situated in the top three and produced an eight-game undefeated streak. They ultimately secured the title in the final two weeks and reached the second stage of the postseason. 

The Serbian White Eagles entered the season as the defending champions with general manager Uroš Stamatović originally returning to manage the squad. Serbia retained their seasoned imports from Europe, while also rejuvenating the roster with graduates from their youth system. Their on-field performance prospered as the White Eagles began the season with a 12-game undefeated streak. Their only defeat occurred in an away match while at home they remained undefeated and held the first position for seven consecutive weeks. A defeat to York Region dropped the Serbs to third and concluded as runners up to Vorkuta by a single point. Unfortunately, they failed to defend their championship after being eliminated by York Region in the semifinals. 

York Region Shooters were consistent challengers for the divisional title. The Vaughan-based team preserved their veteran roster and continued their practice of acquiring additional talent from the Caribbean soccer market. They managed to hold the first position for three different occasions and held the third spot for the majority of the season. York Region continued their reputation as a solid defensive team and as a result, secured the best defensive record. The Shooters were undefeated on the road and eventually finished third in the standings just two points away from the division title. In the postseason the Shooters secured their third CSL Championship.

Midtable contenders  
The fourth position was secured by Scarborough SC as the eastern Toronto club developed into an elite team. Preparations for the season included the recruitment of Krum Bibishkov as a player-coach. Scarborough added more depth to their roster by attracting further overseas talent. The team achieved a five-game undefeated streak towards the conclusion of the season and finished in the top four in best offensive and defensive records. In the postseason Scarborough reached the championship final for the first time in its history. 

Brantford Galaxy secured a postseason berth by finishing fifth in the standings. The Galaxy primarily battled with Scarborough and fluctuated between the fourth and fifth positions. Saša Vuković was the change in the managerial structure and took the team to the first round of the playoffs.

Other teams 
The bottom section of the division featured Milton SC, Royal Toronto FC, and SC Waterloo Region. After competing in the second division for the 2016 season Waterloo returned to the First division with former player Stefan Ristic managing the team. The club produced a mediocre season by finishing in seventh place tied with Milton in points only separated by a lower goal difference.               

Royal Toronto FC an academy operated by former players Dario Brezak and Luka Majstorovic was granted a franchise in the league. The expansion franchise failed to produce sufficient results and finished at the bottom of the standings.

Second Division 
FC Ukraine United decided to relegate themselves to the Second division for the 2017 season. The club continued in attracting seasoned imports from the Ukrainian soccer market and as result achieved a club milestone by producing their first perfect season in the league. The division witnessed the return of Burlington SC where they finished as runners up in the division and faced Ukraine United in the DII Championship final.

First Division

Changes from 2016 
Since 2014 season the First Division has continued to be primarily based in the Greater Toronto Area, as Hamilton City SC and Toronto Atomic FC both failed to renew their membership for the 2017 season. The additions of FC Vorkuta and Royal Toronto FC were brought in as expansions. While SC Waterloo Region was promoted to the First Division to bring the division back to 8 teams. While the Second Division saw an increase to 8 teams with the return of Burlington SC and the relegation of FC Ukraine United.

Teams

Coaching changes

Standings

Positions by round

Season Statistics

Goals

Updated: September 11, 2017 
Source: http://canadiansoccerleague.ca/2017-first-division-stats/

Hat-tricks

Playoffs

Quarterfinals

Semifinals

CSL Championship

Second Division

Teams  
The Second Division increased to include eight teams in total. Departing clubs included the disbandment of defending champions York Region Shooters B, Toronto Atomic FC B, and the promotion of SC Waterloo to the First Division. New entries included the return of Burlington SC, the relegation of FC Ukraine United, and the reserve squads of FC Vorkuta B, SC Waterloo B, and Royal Toronto FC B.

Standings

Season Statistics

Goals

Updated: September 7, 2017
Source: http://canadiansoccerleague.ca/2017-second-division-stats/

Hat-tricks

Playoffs

Quarterfinals

Semifinals

Second Division Championship

References 

Canadian Soccer League (1998–present) seasons
2017 domestic association football leagues
Canadian Soccer League